The Prey is a 1920 American silent drama film directed by George L. Sargent and starring Alice Joyce, Henry Hallam and Harry Benham. It is now considered a lost film

Cast
 Alice Joyce as Helen Reardon
 Henry Hallam as Robert Reardon
 Jack McLean as 	Jack Reardon
 Harry Benham as 	James Calvin
 L. Rogers Lytton as Henry C. Lowe
 H.H. Pattee as 	Nathan Sloane
 William H. Turner as Williard
 Cecil Kern as 	Jesse
 Roy Applegate as 	Pete Canard

References

Bibliography
 Connelly, Robert B. The Silents: Silent Feature Films, 1910-36, Volume 40, Issue 2. December Press, 1998.
 Munden, Kenneth White. The American Film Institute Catalog of Motion Pictures Produced in the United States, Part 1. University of California Press, 1997.

External links
 

1920 films
1920 drama films
1920s English-language films
American silent feature films
Silent American drama films
American black-and-white films
Films directed by George L. Sargent
Vitagraph Studios films
1920s American films